The Bristol Jupiter was a British nine-cylinder single-row piston radial engine built by the Bristol Aeroplane Company. Originally designed late in World War I and known as the Cosmos Jupiter, a lengthy series of upgrades and developments turned it into one of the finest engines of its era.

The Jupiter was widely used on many aircraft designs during the 1920s and 1930s. Thousands of Jupiters of all versions were produced, both by Bristol and abroad under licence.

A turbo-supercharged version of the Jupiter known as the Orion suffered development problems and only a small number were produced. The "Orion" name was later re-used by Bristol for an unrelated turboprop engine.

Design and development
The Jupiter was designed during World War I by Roy Fedden of Brazil Straker and later Cosmos Engineering. The first Jupiter was completed by Brazil Straker in 1918 and featured three carburettors, each one feeding three of the engine's nine cylinders via a spiral deflector housed inside the induction chamber. During the rapid downscaling of military spending after the war, Cosmos Engineering became bankrupt in 1920, and was eventually purchased by the Bristol Aeroplane Company on the strengths of the Jupiter design and the encouragement of the Air Ministry. The engine matured into one of the most reliable on the market. It was the first air-cooled engine to pass the Air Ministry full-throttle test, the first to be equipped with automatic boost control, and the first to be fitted to airliners.

The Jupiter was fairly standard in design, but featured four valves per cylinder, which was uncommon at the time. The cylinders were machined from steel forgings, and the cast cylinder heads were later replaced with aluminium alloy following studies by the Royal Aircraft Establishment. In 1927, a change was made to move to a forged head design due to the rejection rate of the castings. The Jupiter VII introduced a mechanically-driven supercharger to the design, and the Jupiter VIII was the first to be fitted with reduction gears.

In 1925, Fedden started designing a replacement for the Jupiter. Using a shorter stroke to increase the revolutions per minute (rpm), and including a supercharger for added power, resulted in the Bristol Mercury of 1927. Applying the same techniques to the original Jupiter-sized engine in 1927 resulted in the Bristol Pegasus. Neither engine would fully replace the Jupiter for a few years.

Licensed production
The Jupiter saw widespread use in licensed versions, with fourteen countries eventually producing the engine. In France, Gnome-Rhone produced a version known as the Gnome-Rhône 9 Jupiter that was used in several local civilian designs, as well as achieving some export success. Siemens-Halske took out a licence in Germany and produced several versions of increasing power, eventually resulting in the Bramo 323 Fafnir, which saw use in German wartime aircraft.

In Japan, the Jupiter was license-built from 1924 by Nakajima, forming the basis of its own subsequent radial aero-engine design, the Nakajima Ha-1 Kotobuki. It was produced in Poland as the PZL Bristol Jupiter, in Italy as the Alfa Romeo 126-RC35, and in Czechoslovakia by Walter Engines. The most produced version was in the Soviet Union, where its Shvetsov M-22 version powered the initial Type 4 version of the Polikarpov I-16 (55 units produced). Type 4 Polikarpovs can be identified by their lack of exhaust stubs, rounded NACA cowling and lack of cowling shutters, features which were introduced on the Shvetsov M-25 powered Type 5 and later variants (total production 4,500+ units). Production started in 1918 and ceased in 1930.

Variants
The Jupiter was produced in many variants, one of which was the Bristol Orion of 1926. Metallurgy problems with this turbo-supercharged engine caused the project to be abandoned after only nine engines had been built.
Brazil Straker (Cosmos) Jupiter I
(1918) ; only two engines assembled.
Cosmos Jupiter II
(1918) ; a single engine assembled.
Bristol Jupiter II
(1923) .
Bristol Jupiter III
(1923) .

Bristol Jupiter IV
(1926) ; fitted with variable valve timing and a Bristol Triplex carburettor.
Bristol Jupiter V
(1925) .
Bristol Jupiter VI
(1927) ; produced in both high- (6.3:1) and low- (5.3:1) compression ratio versions.
Bristol Jupiter VIA
(1927) ; civil version of Jupiter VI.
Bristol Jupiter VIFH
(1932) ; version of Jupiter VI equipped with gas starter motor.
Bristol Jupiter VIFL
(1932) ; version of Jupiter VI with compression ratio of 5.15:1.
Bristol Jupiter VIFM
(1932) ; version of Jupiter VI with compression ratio of 5.3:1.
Bristol Jupiter VIFS
(1932) ; version of Jupiter VI with compression ratio of 6.3:1.
Bristol Jupiter VII
(1928) ; fitted with supercharger, with compression ratio of 5.3:1; also manufactured by Gnome-Rhone as the 9ASB.
Bristol Jupiter VIIF
(1929) ; version of Jupiter VII with forged cylinder heads.

Bristol Jupiter VIIFP
(1930) ; version of Jupiter VII with pressure feed lubrication to wrist-pins.
Bristol Jupiter VIII
(1929) ; first version with propeller reduction gearing; compression ratio 6.3:1.
Bristol Jupiter VIIIF
(1929) ; version of Jupiter VIII with forged cylinder heads and lowered compression ratio (5.8:1).
Bristol Jupiter VIIIFP
(1929) ; version of Jupiter VIII with pressure feed lubrication (time between overhauls at this stage in development was only 150 hours due to multiple failures).
Bristol Jupiter IX
 ; compression ratio 5.3:1.
Bristol Jupiter IXF
 ; version of Jupiter IX with forged cylinder heads
Bristol Jupiter X
 ; compression ratio 5.3:1.
Bristol Jupiter XF
 ; version of Jupiter X with forged cylinder heads
Bristol Jupiter XFA
 
Bristol Jupiter XFAM
 
Bristol Jupiter XFBM
 
Bristol Jupiter XFS
Fully supercharged.
Bristol Jupiter XI
Compression ratio 5.15:1.
Bristol Jupiter XIF
 ; compression ratio 5.15:1.
Bristol Jupiter XIFA
 ; version of Jupiter XIF with 0.656:1 propeller gear reduction ratio
Bristol Jupiter XIFP
 ; version of Jupiter XIF with pressure feed lubrication.
Bristol Orion I
(1926) Jupiter III, turbo-supercharged, abandoned programme.
Gnome-Rhône 9A JupiterFrench licence production primarily of 9A, 9Aa, 9Ab, 9Ac, 9Akx and 9Ad variants.
Siemens-Halske Sh20, Sh21 and Sh22 Siemens-Halske took out a licence in Germany and produced several versions of increasing power, eventually resulting in the Bramo 323 Fafnir, which saw use in wartime models.
Nakajima Ha-1 Kotobuki In Japan, the Jupiter was licence-built from 1924 by Nakajima.
PZL Bristol Jupiter Polish production.
Alfa Romeo Jupiter Italian licence production, .
Alfa 126 R.C.35 Alfa Romeo developed variant
Walter Jupiter Licence production in Czechoslovakia by Walter Engines
Shvetsov M-22 The most produced version; manufactured in the Soviet Union.
IAM 9AD Jupiter Licence production of the Gnome-Rhône 9A in Yugoslavia
SABCA Jupiter license production in Belgium by SABCA (Société Anonyme Belge de Constructions Aéronautiques)
Piaggio-Jupiter License production by Piaggio

Applications
The Jupiter is probably best known for powering the Handley Page H.P.42 airliners, which flew the London-Paris route in the 1930s. Other civilian uses included the de Havilland Giant Moth and de Havilland Hercules, the Junkers G 31 and the huge Dornier Do X flying boat, which used no less than twelve engines.

Military uses were less common, but included the parent company's Bristol Bulldog, as well as the Gloster Gamecock and Boulton Paul Sidestrand. It was also found in prototypes around the world, from Japan to Sweden.

By 1929 the Bristol Jupiter had flown in 262 different aircraft types, 

Note:

Cosmos Jupiter
 Bristol Badger
 Bristol Bullet
 Sopwith Schneider
 Westland Limousine

Bristol Jupiter

 Aero A.32
 Airco DH.9
 Arado Ar 64
 Avia BH-25
 Avia BH-33E
 Bernard 190
 Blériot-SPAD 51
 Blériot-SPAD S.56
 Boulton & Paul Bugle
 Boulton Paul P.32
 Boulton Paul Partridge
 Boulton Paul Sidestrand
 Blackburn Beagle
 Blackburn Nile
 Blackburn Ripon
 Bristol Badger
 Bristol Badminton
 Bristol Bagshot
 Bristol Beaver
 Bristol Bloodhound
 Bristol Boarhound
 Bristol Brandon
 Bristol Bulldog
 Bristol Bullfinch
 Bristol Jupiter Fighter
 Bristol Seely
 Bristol Type 72
 Bristol Type 75
 Bristol Type 76
 Bristol Type 89
 Bristol Type 92
 Bristol Type 118
 de Havilland Dingo
 de Havilland DH.72
 de Havilland DH.50
 de Havilland Dormouse
 de Havilland Hercules
 de Havilland Hound
 de Havilland Giant Moth
 de Havilland Survey
 Dornier Do 11
 Dornier Do J
 Dornier Do X
 Fairey IIIF
 Fairey Ferret
 Fairey Flycatcher
 Fairey Hendon
 Fokker C.V
 Fokker F.VIIA
 Fokker F.VIII
 Fokker F.IX
 Gloster Gambet
 Gloster Gamecock
 Gloster Gnatsnapper
 Gloster Goldfinch
 Gloster Goral
 Gloster Goring
 Gloster Grebe
 Gloster Mars
 Gloster Survey
 Gourdou-Leseurre LGL.32
 Handley Page Clive
 Handley Page Hampstead
 Handley Page Hare
 Handley Page Hinaidi
 Handley Page HP.12
 Handley Page H.P.42
 Hawker Duiker
 Hawker Harrier
 Hawker Hart
 Hawker Hawfinch
 Hawker Hedgehog
 Hawker Heron
 Hawker Woodcock
 Junkers F.13
 Junkers G 31
 Junkers W 34
 Parnall Plover
 PZL P.7
 Saunders Medina
 Saunders Severn
 Short Calcutta
 Short Chamois
 Short Gurnard
 Short Kent
 Short Rangoon
 Short Scylla
 Short Springbok
 Short S.6 Sturgeon
 Short Valetta
 Supermarine Seagull
 Supermarine Solent
 Supermarine Southampton
 Svenska Aero Jaktfalken
 Tupolev I-4
 Vickers F.21/26
 Vickers F.29/27
 Vickers Jockey
 Vickers Type 143
 Vickers Type 150
 Vickers Valiant
 Vickers Vellore
 Vickers Vellox
 Vickers Vespa
 Vickers Viastra
 Vickers Victoria
 Vickers Vildebeest
 Vickers Vimy
 Vickers Vimy Trainer
 Vickers Wibault Scout
 Villiers 26
 Westland Interceptor
 Westland Wapiti
 Westland Westbury
 Westland Witch
 Westland-Houston PV.3

Gnome-Rhône Jupiter
 Bernard SIMB AB 12
 Blanchard BB-1
 Breguet 19
 Fizir F1M-Jupiter
 Latécoère 6
 Lioré et Olivier LeO H-15
 Potez 29/4
 Wibault Wib.220
 Denhaut Hy.479

Shvetsov M-22
 Kalinin K-5
 Kalinin K-12
 Polikarpov I-5
 Polikarpov I-15
 Polikarpov I-16
 Tupolev I-4
 Yakovlev AIR-7

Engines on display
 A Bristol Jupiter VI is on static display at Aerospace Bristol in the former Bristol Aeroplane Company factory complex in Filton, a suburb of Bristol, United Kingdom.
 A Bristol Jupiter VIIF is on static display at the Shuttleworth Collection in Old Warden, United Kingdom.
 A Bristol Jupiter VIIIF is on static display at the Steven F. Udvar-Hazy Center of the National Air and Space Museum at Washington Dulles International Airport in Fairfax County, Virginia, United States.
 A Bristol Bulldog complete with a Jupiter VIIFP engine is on static display at the Royal Air Force Museum London in Hendon, United Kingdom.

Specifications (Jupiter XFA)

See also

References

Bibliography

 
 Bridgman, L. (ed.) Jane's Fighting Aircraft of World War II. New York: Crescent Books, 1998. 
 Lumsden, Alec. British Piston Engines and their Aircraft. Marlborough, Wiltshire: Airlife Publishing, 2003. .
 Gunston, Bill. Development of Piston Aero Engines. Cambridge, England. Patrick Stephens Limited, 2006. 
 Gunston, Bill. World Encyclopedia of Aero Engines. Cambridge, England. Patrick Stephens Limited, 1989.

Further reading
 Gunston, Bill. By Jupiter! The Life of Sir Roy Fedden. The Johns Hopkins University Press.

External links

  Contemporary article on Cosmos Engineering's air-cooled radial engines. Photos of the Cosmos Jupiter are on page 870, and a short technical description is on page 871.
 Bristol Jupiter endurance test - Flight, March 1926
  A 1929 Flight advertisement for the Jupiter

Aircraft air-cooled radial piston engines
Jupiter
1910s aircraft piston engines